Mian Yousuf Salahuddin, commonly known as Yousaf Salli, is a Pakistani socialite, philanthropist, and ex-politician from Lahore.

Family
He is a maternal grandson of the poet and literary scholar Allama Iqbal and nephew of Javed Iqbal. His paternal grandfather, Mian Amiruddin, was the first Muslim Lord Mayor of Lahore. Salahuddin is a distant relative of the Taseer family, from which the ex-Governor of Punjab Salman Taseer came.

Social life
Salahuddin is the owner and resident of Haveli Barood Khana, a traditional 18th century Mughal-style haveli located in Lahore's walled city. He has hosted parties, dinners, and get-togethers at his residence and elsewhere. High-profile personalities from throughout the country are invited as guests. He is a figure in the city's arts and culture circles who is credited for reviving Basant festivals and organising various musical, artistic, and poetic gatherings; the popular entertainment and music show Virsa: Heritage Revived broadcast on PTV is hosted by Salahuddin and has invited performances from a number of music artists. Pakistan Television Corporation producers and directors have used the above-mentioned Mughal-style haveli's large-sized enclosed outdoors ('haveli sehan' in Urdu language) to hold the music concerts for a live audience for their TV program Virsa: Heritage Revived.

According to a major Pakistani English-language newspaper, Yousuf Salahuddin has been playing a critical role in reviving and promoting the cultural heritage of Pakistan.

References

External links

Living people
Muhammad Iqbal family
Pakistani entertainers
Pakistani philanthropists
Pakistani socialites
People from Lahore
Pakistan People's Party politicians
1951 births
Pakistani people of Kashmiri descent
Pakistani television hosts
Mian family
Members of the National Assembly of Pakistan